Circulus arteriosus may refer to

 Circulus arteriosus major, an anastomosis of the anterior ciliary arteries
 Circulus arteriosus minor, an arterial circle near the pupillary margin of the iris
 Circle of Willis, also known as circulus arteriosus cerebri